The Wetzler Symphony Orchestra was founded in New York City by the Frankfurt born conductor and composer Hermann Hans Wetzler (8 September, 1870 – 29 May, 1943).

Wetzler, who studied at the Hoch Conservatory in Frankfurt, settled in New York City for a time and formed the symphony orchestra in 1903.  Wetzler invited Richard Strauss to the city to conduct his orchestra in a "Strauss Festival", which would include most of his symphonic works. Strauss and Wetzler conducted this orchestra in this concert series beginning on 27 February, 1904 in Carnegie Hall. This series included Strauss conducting the premiere of his Symphonia Domestica on 21 March. Strauss required 15 rehearsals before he was satisfied with the orchestra's playing. On 19 March, the orchestra broke down in the middle of Don Quixote.

Strauss also led the orchestra before a crowd of 6,000 in performances on 16 and 18 of April, 1904 in Wanamaker's New York store. The orchestra was short-lived, as Wetzler returned to Germany in 1905.

References

Sources 
”Herman Wetzler, Composer, 72, Dies” The New York Times, May 30, 1943, page 26.
”Music in America”, The Musical Times, April 1, 1904, page 249.
Tyler, Linda L. “Commerce and Poetry Hand in Hand: Music in American Department Stores, 1880–1930, page 80-81.

Disbanded American orchestras
Musical groups established in 1903
Musical groups disestablished in 1905
1903 establishments in New York City
1905 disestablishments in New York (state)
Orchestras based in New York City